Feliksas Rafailovich Baltušis-Žemaitis (November 30, 1897 – June 1, 1957) was a Lithuanian Red Army major general. He participated in World War I, the Russian Civil War, the Hamburg Uprising, and World War II.

Baltušis-Žemaitis was one of the few Lithuanian officers (others included Vytautas Putna, Ieronim Uborevich, Viktoras Penkaitis) of the Imperial Russian Army who after the February and October Revolutions went to serve in the Red Army. He was a lecturer/docent at the Frunze Military Academy in 1935–1940. Baltušis-Žemaitis briefly commanded the Lithuanian Army in 1940 during Lithuania's incorporation into the Soviet Union. He earned his Candidate of Military Sciences academic degree in 1940. He was also a senior lecturer at the USSR General Staff Academy during 1940–1941 and 1943–1945, and served as the chief of USSR Supreme Command Courses 1945–1947.

Timeline
1940: Commander in Chief of the Lithuanian Army
1942–1943: Commanding Officer of the 16th Lithuanian Rifle Division

Awards
Order of the Red Banner (twice)
Order of Lenin (twice)
Different medals

In 1975 a statue of Baltušis-Žemaitis was built in Šiauliai, Lithuania. After Lithuania regained its independence in 1990, this statue was taken down from its prominent position. It currently stands in the exposition of Soviet sculpture garden in Grūtas Park.

References
Personal record of Major General Baltushis-Zhemaitis F.R., Central Archive of Ministry of Defence,  Podolsk, Moscow reg.
Zhemaitis O.F., "History of family in the documents, The journal "Military History Archive" of № 3,4,5., Moscow, 2007
Stock No.328 (Baltušis-Žemaitis), Library of Lithuanian Academy of Sciences, Vilnius
http://www.generals.dk/general/Baltushis-Zhemaitis/Feliks_Rafailovich/Soviet_Union.html

1897 births
1957 deaths
People from Telšiai County
People from Telshevsky Uyezd
Lithuanian people of World War I
Soviet military personnel of the Russian Civil War
Russian military personnel of World War I
Soviet major generals
Soviet military personnel of World War II
Recipients of the Order of Lenin
Recipients of the Order of the Red Banner
Frunze Military Academy alumni
Academic staff of the Frunze Military Academy